Phi Delta Kappa was an American collegiate fraternity which dissolved in 1881.

History
It was founded in 1874 at Washington & Jefferson College in Washington, Pennsylvania when a chapter of Iota Alpha Kappa resolved to continue after Iota Alpha Kappa's dissolution.  A total of five chapters were formed, but by 1880, four of the five, except for Washington & Jefferson College had become extinct.  That chapter sought to survive by joining another fraternity.  In 1881, the Washington & Jefferson College chapter joined Phi Gamma Delta, taking the designation of Alpha chapter, a designation that had belonged to the founding chapter of Phi Gamma Delta at Jefferson College.

Chapters
 Alpha - 1874-1881 - Washington & Jefferson College (Became a chapter of ΦΓΔ.)
 Beta - 1876-1880 - Western University of Pennsylvania
 Gamma - 1876-1880 - Thiel College
 Delta - 1876-1880 - Lafayette College
 Epsilon - 1878-1880 - "University of Louisiana" now Tulane

References

Student organizations established in 1874
1881 disestablishments in the United States
Student societies in the United States
Defunct fraternities and sororities
1874 establishments in Pennsylvania